Zoo Park is a public park on Independence Avenue in downtown Windhoek, Namibia. It is also a focal point of social life in the city  The current park is landscaped and features a pond, children's playground and open-air theatre.

History

Pre-history
The remains of an elephant from between 5,000 and 20,000 years ago were uncovered in 1961, making the elephant kill there one of the earliest known such events in human history.

Colonial
The area then known as Schutztruppe Memorial was designated by the German colonial authorities in what was then German South West Africa in 1897. It was created to honor the German soldiers who died in the war against Namaqua leader Hendrik Witbooi. The land was transferred to local control in 1911, when it was expanded. Cafe Zoo, which is still in operation, opened in 1916 after the coming of South African military control. From 1960 to 1963, the park was reshaped to accommodate the widening of modern Independence Avenue and Fidel Castro St. (then Kaiser Strasse and Peter Müller Strasse). In 1967, the park was renamed in honor of Dr. Hendrik Verwoerd, the architect of Apartheid. In February 1989, with independence and majority rule just 13 months away, the park was renamed to its current title.

Independence
In August 2006, a suggestion by the group Africawise Namibia suggested the park be renamed in honor of Pan-Africanist Marcus Garvey.

See also
Windhoek
Khomasdal
Katutura

References

Parks in Namibia
Urban public parks
Buildings and structures in Windhoek
Geography of Windhoek
1897 establishments in German South West Africa